Sporting teams around the world use subscription TV channels to promote their brand and team to new and current fans. The ability for sports teams to produce their own television channels requires a significant amount of money and is usually only restricted to large clubs with large amounts of profit such as Manchester United and Barcelona.

Sports team channels on television by the following teams:

France
Olympique Lyonnais - OL TV

Australia

NRL
St George Illawarra Dragons – Dragons TV
Gold Coast Titans – Titans TV

AFL
Hawthorn Hawks- Hawks TV

Canada
Toronto Raptors (NBA)- Raptors TV
Toronto Maple Leafs (NHL)- Leafs TV

England

Premier League
Manchester United – MUTV 1998–
Middlesbrough FC – Boro TV 1997–2002
Chelsea – Chelsea TV
Arsenal – Arsenal TV 2008–2009
Liverpool – LFC TV

Portugal 
FC Porto (Primeira Liga) – Porto Canal
SL Benfica (Primeira Liga) – Benfica TV
Sporting CP (Primeira Liga) – Sporting TV

Scotland

Scottish Premier League
Celtic – Celtic TV 2004–2005
Rangers – Rangers TV 2004–2009

Spain
Barcelona (La Liga)- Barca TV
Real Madrid (La Liga) – Real Madrid TV

United States

In the United States, several regional sports networks are owned by teams, either fully or partially or.

Los Angeles Lakers (NBA)- Lakers TV

New York Yankees (MLB)- YES Network

Chicago Cubs (MLB)- Marquee Sports Network

Sports television